Holy @#%*! is an extreme sports viral video reality television series which aired on Versus in the United States from 2009 to 2011. 13 episodes exist and aired on the channel until the spring of 2011, when it was removed from airing due to Versus coming into the purview of NBC Sports after Versus's owner Comcast was approved to take over NBCUniversal, and NBC Sports found low-brow clip programs like Holy @#%*!! and Whacked Out Sports were inappropriate for what it saw as a serious contender against ESPN when it was re-branded as the NBC Sports Network in January 2012.

The program was purposefully titled so that the second word was bleeped when said on-air.

External links
 Versus Holy @#%*! website
 

2009 American television series debuts
2011 American television series endings
2000s American reality television series
2010s American reality television series
2000s American video clip television series
2010s American video clip television series
NBCSN shows
American sports television series
English-language television shows